The U.S. commonwealth of the Northern Mariana Islands first required its residents to register their motor vehicles and display license plates in 1968.

Passenger baseplates 1968 to present
Since 1989, all passenger plates have featured a round mounting hole at the top right and horizontal slots in the other three corners, as with plates of Hawaii and Guam.

References

+Northern Mariana Islands
Northern Mariana Islands-related lists
Transportation in the Northern Mariana Islands